The red-tailed spider hunter (Tachypompilus unicolor) is a species of spider wasp from western North America.

Description
Especially in the subspecies T. u. cerinus, the body is often entirely red, with yellow, dark-margined wings.

Distribution
It is found in Southern California, including the northern Baja California and the Channel Islands, north to the Okanagan Valley, southern British Columbia, eastwards through southwestern Idaho to western South Dakota and northern Utah.

Biology
Adults of T. unicolor feed at honeydew secretions and flowers. Females have been captured at honeydew from galls of Disholcapsis eldoradensis on Quercus lobata and at flowers of Asclepias erosa, Baccharis sarothroides, Chrysothamnus sp., Lepidospartum squamatum, and Wislizenia refracta.  Males have been taken on the flowers of Calochortus catalinae, Hemizonia fasciculata, Rhamnus californica, and Xanthium spinosum. Both males and females visit the extrafloral nectaries of Helianthus and have been collected at flowers of Atriplex semibaccata, Cicuta sp., Eriogonum fasciculatum, Eriogonum gracile, and Foeniculum vulgare. The flight period in California is from May to October, with a peak in July and August.

Subspecies
T. u. cerinus Evans in the eastern part of the species range
T. u. unicolor Banks, distinguished by darker, often violaceous wings and having the mesosoma frequently being partially black, predominantly in the males, western part of the range

References

Insects described in 1919
Pompilinae
Hymenoptera of North America
Taxa named by Nathan Banks